Stockley may refer to:

Places
Stockley, Delaware, an area in the USA
Stockley, Devon, a village in the UK
Stockley, County Durham, formerly a civil parish in the UK
Stockley, Wiltshire, a village in the UK
Stockley Park, a business estate in London
Stockley Academy, a secondary school in London

Other uses
Stockley (surname)

See also
Stockleigh (disambiguation)
Stokley (disambiguation)